Muzigaleh (also Romanized as Mūzīgaleh) is a village in Feyziyeh Rural District, in the Central District of Babol County, Mazandaran Province, Iran. At the 2006 census, its population was 608, in 161 families.

References 

Populated places in Babol County